John George Heileman (August 10, 1872 – July 19, 1940) was an American professional baseball infielder. He played briefly in Major League Baseball for the 1901 Cincinnati Reds. He was erroneously known as Chink Heileman.

Biography
Heileman played five games for the Cincinnati Reds in July 1901, registering two hits in 15 at bats along with one run scored and one run batted in. Defensively, he played four games as a third baseman and one game as a second baseman. The only other team Heileman is known to have played for was the minor league Beaumont Oil Gushers of the South Texas League in 1903, appearing in 115 games and compiling a .172 batting average.

Heileman later became a night watchman at a music hall; he died in 1940. He was survived by his wife, a daughter, and a son.

Before May 2021, Heileman was listed on the Baseball-Reference.com site under the nickname "Chink" Heileman. However, contemporary newspaper reports from his brief baseball career are only known to have referred to him by his surname, and his death notice made no mention of a nickname. His son, George, who was also a professional baseball player (although not in the major leagues), was known by that nickname.

References

External links

1872 births
1940 deaths
Baseball players from Cincinnati
Major League Baseball third basemen
Cincinnati Reds players
Beaumont Oil Gushers players